The Kansas Supreme Court Nominating Commission was established in 1958 when Kansas voters approved an amendment to the state's constitution. The commission is tasked with presenting the governor with a slate of three qualified candidates whenever a vacancy occurs on the Kansas Supreme Court. The governor interviews the candidates and makes the appointment. This process, known as merit selection, is used by Kansas and 21 other states, along with the District of Columbia, for selecting all members of their highest court.

The Court of Appeals used the same process until 2013 when the Kansas Legislature changed the process to allow the governor to nominate a candidate who is then approved by the Kansas Senate.

The commission has nine members. Four are non-attorneys appointed by the governor; four others are attorneys selected by attorneys in each of the state's four congressional districts. The chair of the commission, an attorney, is elected by attorneys in a statewide vote. The current chair is Anne Burke.

After being appointed to the Kansas Supreme Court bench, a justice is subject to a retention election after one year. Subsequently, justices are subject to retention elections every six years.

Current members of the commission

Attorney members
 Anne Burke, chair
 First congressional district: David Rebein
 Second congressional district: Natalie Haag
 Third congressional district: Matthew Keenan
 Fourth congressional district: Jay Fowler
Non attorney members
 First congressional district: Linda Weis
 Second congressional district: Felita Kahrs
 Third congressional district: Robert Hayworth
 Fourth congressional district: Dennis Hedke

Proposed changes to the selection process
Periodically, Kansas legislators propose to change the way Kansas Supreme Court justices are selected, which would require an amendment to the state constitution. As recently as February 2016, such an attempt was defeated in the legislature.

Stephen Ware, a law professor at the University of Kansas, is a critic of the way justices are selected in Kansas.  In a 2007 paper, he wrote, "Kansas is the only state in the union that gives the members of its bar majority control over the selection of state supreme court justices."

However, five other states — Florida, Missouri, South Dakota, Tennessee, and Wyoming — and the District of Columbia 
have merit selection commissions where a majority of the members are attorneys.

References

External links 
 Stand fast against latest attempt to control Kansas courts, The Kansas City Star, Feb. 3, 2016.
 Still no need to politicize courts, Wichita Eagle Blog, Jan. 15, 2007.
 Supreme Court Nominating Commission, Kansas Judicial Branch

Kansas Supreme Court
1958 establishments in Kansas